The Embassy of Kenya in Washington, D.C. is the Republic of Kenya's diplomatic mission to the United States, located in the Kalorama neighborhood at 2249 R Street Northwest, Washington, D.C.  It is headed by Lazarus O. Amayo.

Building
Previous owners of the Beaux-Arts building include C. Peyton Russell (original owner; 1908–1915), politician James D. Phelan (residence while serving in the United States Senate; 1915–1921) and the government of Sweden (embassy; 1921–1971). The 2009 property value of the Kenyan embassy is $6,554,280 ($6,133,120 – main building; $421,160 – side building). It is a contributing property to the Massachusetts Avenue Historic District and Sheridan-Kalorama Historic District.

References

External links

Official website
wikimapia

Kenya
Washington, D.C.
Sheridan-Kalorama Historic District
Kenya
Historic district contributing properties in Washington, D.C.
Kenya–United States relations